Coxon is a surname. Notable people with the surname include:

 Alan Coxon (cricketer) (19302012), English cricketer
 Alan Coxon (born before 2006), British TV chef and presenter
Alec Coxon (19162006), English cricketer
 Allan Coxon (19092001), English academic who specialised in classical Greek and ancient philosophy
 Chris Coxon (born 1987), British actor known for the film Sherlock Holmes.
Graham Coxon (born 1969), English musician, singer-songwriter and painter, a founding member of the band Blur
John Coxon (pirate) (active 167782), referred to as John Coxen in some sources
 John Coxon (born before 1993), member of English band Spring Heel Jack
 Lucinda Coxon (born 1962), English playwright and screenwriter
 Mark Coxon (born 1978), English cricketer
 Roy Coxon (born before 1952), English-born footballer who played for New Zealand
 Scott Coxon (born 1973), Australian rugby league player
 Tom Coxon (18831942), English footballer

See also
 Coxonclub.com - Life Stories of Coxon people
 Göksun, a town in Kahramanmaraş Province, Turkey sometimes Latinised as Coxon
 "The Coxon Fund", an 1894 short story by Henry James
 Cock (surname)
 Cocks (surname)
 Cox (surname)
 Coxe
 Coxen
 Coxsone